The 26th Torino Film Festival was held 21 – 29 November 2008 in Turin, Italy, directed by Nanni Moretti.

Films in competition
Bitter & Twisted - Christopher Weekes
Burn the Bridges (Quemar las Naves) - Francisco Franco-Alba
Give Me Your Hand - Pascal-Alex Vincent
Helen - Joe Lawlor, Christine Mollowy
Momma's Man - Azazel Jacobs
My Friend from Faro (Mein Freund aus Faro) - Nana Neul
The New Year Parade - Tom Quinn
Noise (Entre os Dedos) - Tiago Guedes, Frederico Serra
Prince of Broadway - Sean Baker
The Shaft (Dixia De Tiankong) - Zhang Chi
Tomorrow (Demain) - Maxime Giroux
Tony Manero - Pablo Larraín
Unspoken - Fien Troch
The Wave - Dennis Gansel
We've Never Been to Venice - Blaz Kutin

Out of competition
24 City - Jia Zhangke (China)
Days of the Turquoise Sky (Kurus) - Woo Ming Jin (Malaysia)
Dream - Kim Ki-duk (South Korea/Japan)
The Edge of Love - John Maybury (UK)
The Escapist - Rupert Wyatt (Ireland/UK)
Filth and Wisdom - Madonna (UK)
Gigantic - Matt Aselton (US)
Highway World: Living, Changing, Growing - Martin Hans Schmitt (Germany)
Katyń - Andrzej Wajda (Poland)
Lake Tahoe - Fernando Eimbcke (Mexico)
Lemon Tree - Eran Riklis (Israel/Germany/France)
Let the Right One In - Tomas Alfredson (Sweden)
Mateo Falcone - Éric Vuillard (France)
New Orleans, Mon Amour - Michael Almereyda (US)
Night and Day - Hong Sang-soo (South Korea)
Of Time and the City - Terence Davies (UK)
Real Time - Randall Cole (Canada)
Rumba - Dominique Abel, Fiona Gordon (France)
Shiva (7 Days) - Ronit Elkabetz, Shlomi Elkabetz (France/Israel)
Somers Town - Shane Meadows (UK)
W. - Oliver Stone (US)
Wendy and Lucy - Kelly Reichardt (US)

The State of Things
Armando e la politica - Chiara Malta (Italy)
The Baby Formula - Alison Reid (Canada)
Le Chant des mariées - Karin Albou (France)
La conquista della vita - Silvano Agosti (Italy)
Crips and Bloods: Made in America - Stacy Peralta (US)
Di madre in figlia - Andrea Zambelli (Italy)
The Exiles - Kent Mackenzie (US)
The Fire, the Blood, the Stars (Le Feu, le sang, les etoiles) - Caroline Deruas Garrel (France)
Hunger - Steve McQueen (UK/Ireland)
Mai 68, La Belle ouvrage - Jean-Luc and Loic Magneron (France)
The Sun Street Boys - Gyorgy Szomjas (Hungary)
No Son Invisibles: Maya Women and Microfinance, Featuring Muhammad Yunus - Melissa Eidson (Mexico/US)
Religulous - Larry Charles (US)
Sidney Poitier: Un outsider à Hollywood - Catherine Arnaud (France)
United Red Army - Kōji Wakamatsu (Japan)

La Zona
Birdsong (El cant dels ocells) - Albert Serra (Spain)
Extraordinary Stories (Historias extraordinarias) - Mariano Llinas (Argentina)
Now Showing - Raya Martin (Philippines)
Nucingen House - Raúl Ruiz (France/Chile)Pane/Piazza delle Camelie - Tonino De Bernardi (Italy)Parade - Brandon Cahoon (US)Still Walking - Hirokazu Kore-Eda (Japan)Trilogia: il Pensiero, lo Sguardo, la Parola - Luciano Emmer (Italy)Wings of a Butterfly (Le Battement d'ailes d'un papillon) - Aleksandr Balagura (France/Ukraine)A Zona - Sandro Aguilar (Portugal)

Awards
Jury Special Prize:Prince of Broadway - Sean Baker
Cipputi Award for Best Film:Noise (Entre os Dedos)'' - Tiago Guedes, Frederico Serra

References

External links

2008 Torino Film Festival at the Internet Movie Database

Torino
Torino
Torino
Torino Film Festival